The Tugboat hitch (a.k.a. Backhanded mooring hitch or Lighterman's Hitch) is a knot ideal for heavy towing, or making fast to a post, bollard, or winch.  It is easy to release, even under great load.

Tying
To tie, take a single turn or a round turn around the post.  Pass a bight under the standing part, then drop the bight over the top of the post. Then make a bight in the rope on the other side of the standing part and drop it over the post. Note that in each placement of a bight over the post, the end's side of the bight should lead to the side away from the standing part—this will make casting off easier. Continue this repetition as necessary until secure (usually three bights). Finish by half-hitching a bight around the standing part or a round turn about the post. With heavy loads, it is important to have made enough bights and turns to reduce force on the final turns or a hitch—otherwise, it will be difficult to untie (a hitch) or may slip.

See also
List of knots

External links
Animation of tying at Animated Knots.